Lala Lajpat Rai Hospital is a government hospital in Swaroop Nagar, Kanpur, which was earlier called Hallet Hospital, and its campus stand adjacent to the Moti Jheel lake and is spread across 960 acres.

It is associated with GSVM Medical College, Kanpur.

History
The hospital was named after governor of United Provinces of Agra and Oudh Sir Maurice Hallett.

Facilities
The main building of L.L.R. Hospital houses the departments of Medicine; Surgery; Orthopedics; Ophthalmology; Ear, Nose and Throat; Skin and Sexually Transmitted Disease; Radio Diagnosis; Outpatient; Mortuary; Casualty; Emergency Intensive Care Unit (I.C.U.); Medicine I.C.U.; and Burn Unit.

References

External links
Official website
Lala Lajpat Rai Hospital (LLR Hospital) at wikimapia

Hospital buildings completed in 1944
Hospitals in Kanpur
Memorials to Lala Lajpat Rai
Hospitals established in 1944
1944 establishments in India
20th-century architecture in India